Pegesimallus is a genus of robber flies.

Distribution
Africa and Eurasia.

Biology
These species spend much of their time perched in the shade on shrubs or grass, where they lie in wait for flying insects. Their prey includes a wide variety of arthropods; Hymenoptera and Diptera predominate. Females oviposit in the surface layer of the soil.

Taxonomy
The classification of the species in this genus is difficult for two main reasons: Firstly, many are sexually dimorphic to the extent that females and males of the same species were, for some time, placed in different genera; and secondly, some of the species are so similar that they can only be separated by considering details of the male genitalia.

The genus has been placed in the tribe Megapodini of the subfamily Dasypogoninae. It contains about 54 species, including the following:

 Pegesimallus apicalis Bromley, 1947
 Pegesimallus brunneus Londt, 1980
 Pegesimallus bulbifrons Londt, 1980
 Pegesimallus calvifrons Londt, 1980
 Pegesimallus claelius Walker, 1849
 Pegesimallus fusticulus Londt, 1980
 Pegesimallus hermanni Londt, 1980
 Pegesimallus irwini Londt, 1980
 Pegesimallus isanicus Tomasovic, 2005
 Pegesimallus kenyensis Londt, 1980
 Pegesimallus mesasiatica Lehr, 1958
 Pegesimallus namibiensis Londt, 1980
 Pegesimallus oldroydi Londt, 1980
 Pegesimallus saegeri Oldroyd, 1970
 Pegesimallus srilankensis Londt, 1980
 Pegesimallus vansoni Londt, 1980
 Pegesimallus volcata Walker, 1849
 Pegesimallus yerburyi Londt, 1980

References

External links

Asilidae genera